The 2011 Women's World Floorball Championships were the eighth world championships in women's floorball. The tournament was held from 4 December to 11 December 2011 in St. Gallen, Switzerland. The matches took place in Athletik Zentrum and Kreuzbleichhalle.

Sweden won the tournament defeating Finland, 4-2, in the final-game.

Qualifying

Under the IFF's new qualification system, the 23 countries registered for the world championships had to qualify for 16 spots. 8 of these spots had already been pre-determined, with the top 7 teams from the 2009 Women's World Floorball Championships A-Division and the top team from the B-Division automatically qualifying:

The remaining 8 spots were determined from continental qualifying tournaments:

Championship results

Preliminary round

Group A

Group B

Group C

Group D

Playoff round

Quarter finals

Semi-finals

Bronze medal game

Gold medal game

Placement round

13-16

9-12

15th Place match

13th Place match

11th Place match

9th Place match

5-8

5th Place match

Leading scorers

All-Star team
Goalkeeper:  Jana Christianová
Defense:     Emelie Wibron,  Tia Ukkonen
Forward:     Emelie Lindström,  Corin Rüttimann,   Sara Kristoffersson
ASICS Golden Floorball Shoe MVP Trophy:  Sara Kristoffersson

Ranking

Official 2011 Rankings according to the IFF

References

External links
 Official website
 Official Standings (IFF)

2011, Women's
Floorball
Women's World Floorball Championships, 2011
International floorball competitions hosted by Switzerland
Sport in St. Gallen (city)
Women's World Floorball Championships